The 2014 Giro d'Italia began on 9 May, and stage 21 occurred on 1 June.

Stage 12
22 May 2014 — Barbaresco to Barolo, individual time trial (ITT)

Stage 13
23 May 2014 — Fossano to Rivarolo Canavese,

Stage 14
24 May 2014 — Agliè to Oropa,

Stage 15
25 May 2014 — Valdengo to Montecampione,

Stage 16
27 May 2014 — Ponte di Legno to Val Martello–Martelltal,

Stage 17
28 May 2014 — Sarnonico to Vittorio Veneto,

Stage 18
29 May 2014 — Belluno to Rifugio Panarotta–Valsugana,

Stage 19
30 May 2014 — Bassano del Grappa to Cima Grappa–Crespano del Grappa, individual time trial (ITT)

Stage 20
31 May 2014 — Maniago to Monte Zoncolan,

Stage 21
1 June 2014 — Gemona del Friuli to Trieste,

References

2014 Giro d'Italia
Giro d'Italia stages